The Satellite Award for Best DVD Release of TV Shows was an award given by the International Press Academy from 2004 to 2009.

Winners and nominees

References

DVD Release of TV Shows